Oscilla notialis is a species of sea snail, a marine gastropod mollusk in the family Pyramidellidae, the pyrams and their allies.

Description
The length of the shell measures 1.9 mm.

Distribution
This species occurs in the demersal zone of the Atlantic Ocean off Brazil at depths between 79 m and 327 m.

References

 Pimenta, A. D., F. N. Santos and R. S. Absalao. 2008. Review of the genera Ividia, Folinella, Oscilla, Pseudoscilla, Tryptichus [sic] and Peristichia (Gastropoda: Pyramidellidae) from Brazil, with descriptions of four new species. Veliger 50: 171-184.

External links
 To Encyclopedia of Life
 To World Register of Marine Species
 

Pyramidellidae
Gastropods described in 2008